Robert Douglas may refer to:

Entertainment
 Robert Langton Douglas (1864–1951), British art critic and director of the National Gallery of Ireland
 Robert Douglas (actor) (1909–1999), British actor
 Róbert Ingi Douglas (born 1973), Icelandic film director

Military
 Robert Douglas, Count of Skenninge (1611–1662), Scottish-born field-marshal in the Swedish army
 Sir Robert Douglas, 3rd Baronet (died 1692), Scottish soldier
 Robert Douglas (1727–1809), career soldier, field marshal of the Netherlands
 Robert Percy Douglas (1805–1891), British Army officer who became Lieutenant Governor of Jersey
 Robert Douglas (Royal Navy officer) (1829–1910), British admiral

Politics and law
 Sir Robert Douglas of Lochleven (died 1547), Scottish courtier and landowner
 Robert Douglas, Provost of Lincluden (died 1609), Scottish landowner, courtier, and administrator
 Robert Douglas, 1st Viscount of Belhaven (1573–1639), Scottish courtier
 Robert Douglas, 8th Earl of Morton (died 1649), Scottish nobleman
 Robert Douglas (British politician) (c.  1703–1745), MP for Orkney and Shetland, British army officer
 Robert Douglas (New Zealand politician) (1837–1884)
 Robert M. Douglas (1849–1917), North Carolina Supreme Court justice
 Robert Dick Douglas (1875–1960), American lawyer and son of Robert M. Douglas
 Robert Albert Douglas (1887–1959), contractor and political figure in Nova Scotia, Canada

Science
 Robert Douglas (horticulturist) (1813–1897), English American horticulturalist and forestry consultant
 R. J. W. Douglas (1920–1979), Canadian geologist
 Robert M. Douglas (doctor) (born 1936), academic, researcher, and administrator

Sports
 Robert Noel Douglas (1868–1957), English cricketer and priest
 Robert Douglas (American football) (born 1982), retired American football fullback
 Rab Douglas (born 1972), Scottish football goalkeeper
 Rob Douglas (born 1971), American speed sailor

Other
 Robert Douglas (minister) (1594–1674), minister in the Church of Scotland
 Sir Robert Douglas, 6th Baronet (1694–1770), Scottish genealogist
 Robert Douglas (bishop) (died 1716), Scottish prelate
 Robert Kennaway Douglas (1838–1913), British oriental scholar
 Robert Waite Douglas (1854–1931), Canadian librarian

See also
 Bob Douglas (1882–1979), American sports manager, founder of the New York Renaissance
 Bobby Douglas (born 1942), wrestling coach
 Bobby Douglass (born 1947), American football player
 Robert Douglass Jr. (1809–1887), African-American artist and activist